The Wushu Federation of the Philippines (WFP) is the official national governing body for Wushu in the Philippines under the International Wushu Federation. The WFP is a regular member of Philippine Olympic Committee as NSA or National Sports Association.

In 2008, the WFP was recognized as the "National Sports Association of the Year" by the Philippine Sportswriters Association (PSA) due to the impressive achievements of nanquan athlete Willy Wang at the 2007 World Wushu Championships and the 2008 Beijing Wushu Tournament. In 2016, the federation won the same reward due to the double gold medal victories of sanda athletes Divine Wally and Arnel Mandal at the 2015 World Wushu Championships held in Jakarta, Indonesia as well as the several victories of Daniel Parantac at the 2015 Southeast Asian Games.

The Philippines at the World Wushu Championships 
The Philippines has been very successful at the World Wushu Championships among various other international wushu competitions.

The International Wushu Federation does not publish all-time medal tables or medal statistics per each national federation. The IWUF only publishes individual championships results and thus the tables below are compilations of those results.

Medals by Championships

Notable Athletes

Taolu 

 Agatha Wong
 Daniel Parantac

Sanda 

 Amado Benito Jr.
 Eduard Folayang
 Mark Eddiva

External links
Wushu Federation of the Philippines profile at the Philippine Olympic Committee website

References

Philippines
Wushu in the Philippines
Wushu